Risk factor in epidemiology is a variable associated with an increased risk of disease or infection.

Risk factor may also refer to:
 Risk factor (criminology)
 Risk dominance in game theory
 Risk factor (finance)
 Risk factor (computing)